Heilmann is a German language surname. It can be tracked to early 16th-century Protestant families in south-west Germany (various locations); In France, it has spread around 1545 to Mulhouse (Mülhausen in German), a city now in the Alsace region.

Members of the Heilmann family of Mulhouse, of Protestant faith, issued from Lorentz Heilmann, a cooper, common ancestor born in 1545 in Niedernhall (now in Germany) and having established himself in Mulhouse:
 Jean-Gaspard Heilmann (c. 1718 – 1760), French painter
 Nicolas Heilmann, Burgmeister (mayor) of Mulhouse from 1753 to 1766.
 Josué Heilmann (1796–1848), inventor, in particular of a hand embroidery machine.
 Jean-Jacques Heilmann (1822–1859), early photographer and cofounder of the Société Française de Photographie.
 Jean-Jacques Heilmann (1853–1922), inventor of the Heilmann locomotive "La Fusée Electrique", one of the first electric locomotives.

Members of the Heilmann family initially from Geiselbach, who co-founded the Heilmann & Littmann German building company:

 Jakob Heilmann, (1846–1927), co-founder of the company
 Otto Heilmann (1888–1945), German architect
 Albert Heilmann, (1869–1949), German architect
 Mary Heilmann (born 1940), American artist.

Other people bearing this name:

In Germany: 
 Pr Sebastian Heilmann (b.1965), German political scientist and sinologist.
 Lutz Heilmann, (b.1966), German politician (Die Linke) and member of the German Parliament for Schleswig-Holstein.
 Thomas Heilmann (b. 1964), German politician (CDU)

In other countries than France and Germany :
 Gerhard Heilmann, Danish artist and paleontologist. 
 Harry Heilmann, American baseball player [issued from a 17th-century "Heylmann" ancestor from South-West Germany]
 Joe Heilmann,(1931-2010), American golfer [German ancestry, born Chicago, IL]

See also
Heilman

German-language surnames